Thayyeni is a village under located in the Kasargod district, India. It is a hilly area.

History
Early migration took place in 1958. There were about 30 migrated families in this area by 1965. The famine after World War II saw a large-scale migration of people from Central Travancore (specially from Meenachil Taluk) to this area. The majority of them were Roman Catholic Christians who had a different social and agricultural background. They were hard-working people, and they brought new agricultural practices to this area. They introduced cash crops like rubber to the local people. The major plantation crops of this areas since then have been rubber, arecanut, coconut, pepper etc.

Lourde Matha Church, Thayyeni was established as the filial church of Palavayal Church in 1966. It was raised to a parish on 1 May 1982. The first Holy Mass was offered by Rev. Fr. Philip Murinjakallel. The construction of the new church was completed during the tenure of Rev. Fr. George Arikunnel.

Climate
Thayyeni has a tropical monsoon climate (Am) with little to no rainfall from December to March and heavy to extremely heavy rainfall from April to November.

Politics
Thayyeni is part of the Kasargode Lok Sabha constituency and Trikaripur Assembly Constituency. Main political parties in Thayyeni are CPI(M), Indian National Congres and Kerala Congress(M) is the present MP from  Kasaragod. M. Rajagopalan  CPI(M) is the sitting MLA of Trikaripur Assembly Constituency.

Medical Facilities
Primary Health Center Thayyeni.nearest medical facilities are at:
 Family Health Center Chittarikkal (10 km).
 PHC, Pulingome (6 km)
 Cooperative hospital Cherupuzha (13 km)
 St Sebastian’s Hospital, Kakkayamchal, Cherupuzha (13 km)
 Govt Homoeo Dispensary Kannivayal (9 km)

Transportation

Local roads have access to NH.66, which connects to Mangalore in the north and Calicut in the south. The nearest railway station is Cheruvathur on Mangalore–Palakkad line. There are airports at Kannur, Mangalore and Calicut

References

Cheruvathur area